In electromagnetism, a magnetic dipole is the limit of either a closed loop of electric current or a pair of poles as the size of the source is reduced to zero while keeping the magnetic moment constant. It is a magnetic analogue of the electric dipole, but the analogy is not perfect. In particular, a true magnetic monopole, the magnetic analogue of an electric charge, has never been observed in nature. However, magnetic monopole quasiparticles have been observed as emergent properties of certain condensed matter systems. Moreover, one form of magnetic dipole moment is associated with a fundamental quantum property—the spin of elementary particles.

Because magnetic monopoles do not exist, the magnetic field at a large distance from any static magnetic source looks like the field of a dipole with the same dipole moment. For higher-order sources (e.g. quadrupoles) with no dipole moment, their field decays towards zero with distance faster than a dipole field does.

External magnetic field produced by a magnetic dipole moment 

In classical physics, the magnetic field of a dipole is calculated as the limit of either a current loop or a pair of charges as the source shrinks to a point while keeping the magnetic moment constant. For the current loop, this limit is most easily derived from the vector potential:

 

The magnetic flux density (strength of the B-field) is then

Alternatively one can obtain the scalar potential first from the magnetic pole limit,

and hence the magnetic field strength (or strength of the H-field) is

The magnetic field strength is symmetric under rotations about the axis of the magnetic moment.

Internal magnetic field of a dipole 

The two models for a dipole (current loop and magnetic poles), give the same predictions for the magnetic field far from the source. However, inside the source region they give different predictions. The magnetic field between poles is in the opposite direction to the magnetic moment (which points from the negative charge to the positive charge), while inside a current loop it is in the same direction (see the figure to the right). Clearly, the limits of these fields must also be different as the sources shrink to zero size. This distinction only matters if the dipole limit is used to calculate fields inside a magnetic material.

If a magnetic dipole is formed by making a current loop smaller and smaller, but keeping the product of current and area constant, the limiting field is

where  is the Dirac delta function in three dimensions. Unlike the expressions in the previous section, this limit is correct for the internal field of the dipole.

If a magnetic dipole is formed by taking a "north pole" and a "south pole", bringing them closer and closer together but keeping the product of magnetic pole-charge and distance constant, the limiting field is

is the magnetization.

Forces between two magnetic dipoles 

The force  exerted by one dipole moment  on another  separated in space by a vector  can be calculated using:

or

 

where  is the distance between dipoles.

The torque can be obtained from the formula

Dipolar fields from finite sources 

The magnetic scalar potential  produced by a finite source, but external to it, can be represented by a multipole expansion. Each term in the expansion is associated with a characteristic moment and a potential having a characteristic rate of decrease with distance  from the source. Monopole moments have a  rate of decrease, dipole moments have a  rate, quadrupole moments have a  rate, and so on. The higher the order, the faster the potential drops off. Since the lowest-order term observed in magnetic sources is the dipolar term, it dominates at large distances. Therefore, at large distances any magnetic source looks like a dipole of the same magnetic moment.

Notes

References 

Magnetostatics
Magnetism
Electric and magnetic fields in matter